Vermicularia bathyalis is a species of sea snail, a marine gastropod mollusk in the family Turritellidae.

Distribution

Description 
The maximum recorded shell length is 62 mm.

Habitat 
Minimum recorded depth is 400 m. Maximum recorded depth is 400 m.

References

Turritellidae
Gastropods described in 2002